Ferdinand Hirzeger (born 2 June 1976) is an Austrian luger who competed from 1996 to 2003. A natural track luger, he won the silver medal in the men's singles at the 2001 FIL World Luge Natural Track Championships in Stein an der Enns, Austria.

References
FIL-Luge profile
Natural track World Championships results: 1979-2007

External links 
 

1976 births
Living people
Austrian male lugers